Blue Horse or Blue Horses may refer to:

 The Blue Horse of Guru Gobind Singh Ji. The Tenth Guru of the Sikh religion rode a blue horse; he also had a White Falcon.
Blue Horse (Lakota leader), Oglala Lakota leader
Blue Horses or Die grossen blauen Pferde (The Large Blue Horses), a 1911 painting by Franz Marc
Little Blue Horse, or Blaues Pferdchen, a 1912 painting by Franz Marc
Blue Horse (album), debut album by the Be Good Tanyas
Bleu Horses, a herd of sculptured steel horses by Jim Dolan
A blue dun horse coat color, also called grullo
A blue roan horse coat color
The Blue Horsehead Nebula, IC 4592
The Bluehorses, a  Celtic rock band from Cardiff, Wales
The Blue Horse, a 2009 film starring Antonie Kamerling
Denver airport statue

See also
Blue Peter (disambiguation), various meanings, including horses
Brown Bear, Brown Bear, What Do You See?, which references a blue horse